Viktoriya Kesar (born 11 August 1993) is a Ukrainian diver. She is a European champion and medalist. She won her gold medal in 3m synchronized diving with Stanislav Oliferchyk at the 2019 European Diving Championships, they also won silver medals in 2017. In 2019 she also won a bronze medal of the European Championships in 3m synchro diving with her partner Hanna Pysmenska.

In 2017 she won silver medal at the 2017 Summer Universiade.

References

Ukrainian female divers
1993 births
Sportspeople from Zaporizhzhia
Living people
Universiade medalists in diving
Universiade bronze medalists for Ukraine
Medalists at the 2017 Summer Universiade
Divers at the 2020 Summer Olympics
Olympic divers of Ukraine